Master of His Fate is a novel by James MacLaren Cobban published in 1890.

Plot summary
Master of His Fate is a novel in which psychic vampirism features a scientific rather than supernatural rationale.

Reception
Dave Langford reviewed Master of His Fate for White Dwarf #92, and stated that " historical interest isn't sustained by the feeble and florid writing."

Reviews
Review by Tom Jones (1987) in Vector 139
Review by Don D'Ammassa (1987) in Science Fiction Chronicle, #97 October 1987

References

1890 novels